Olga Munteanu (born 18 October 1927) is a former artistic gymnast. She competed at the 1952 Summer Olympics.

References

External links
  

1927 births
Possibly living people
Romanian female artistic gymnasts
Gymnasts at the 1952 Summer Olympics
Olympic gymnasts of Romania